Bathory was a Swedish black metal band formed in Vällingby in March 1983. Named after Hungarian countess Elizabeth Báthory, they are considered pioneers of black metal (alongside Venom and Mercyful Fate) and Viking metal. The book Lords of Chaos described Bathory's first four albums as "the blueprint for Scandinavian black metal." Acts influenced by their early records include Mayhem, Burzum, Darkthrone, Gorgoroth, Satyricon, Emperor, Dark Funeral, Enslaved, Marduk, Moonsorrow and Dimmu Borgir.

Bathory abandoned the black metal sound for their fifth record, Hammerheart (1990), which is often cited as the first Viking metal album. The band continued in the Viking metal style for most of their remaining existence, although they experimented with a thrash metal style on the albums Requiem (1994) and Octagon (1995). They stopped performing live early on and never toured; frontman, founder and main songwriter Tomas "Quorthon" Forsberg was the sole constant member and at times responsible for all instruments. Bathory ended when Forsberg died from heart failure at the age of 38 in 2004.

History

Early years (1980s) 
Bathory formed in Vällingby in March 1983. Quorthon, a 17-year-old guitarist (then known as "Ace Shoot", a name inspired by sex jokes, two Motörhead songs – Ace of Spades and Sharpshooter – and Ace Frehley of Kiss), was joined by bass guitarist Frederick Melander ("Hanoi") and drummer Jonas Åkerlund ("Vans McBurger"). According to Quorthon, he settled on the name 'Bathory' after a visit to the London Dungeon, although Jonas says that it was also inspired and taken from the Venom song "Countess Bathory". The Venom song was based on the life of Elizabeth Báthory who is believed to be one of the most prolific female murderesses. Before settling on 'Bathory', the band considered several names; including Nosferatu, Natas, Mephisto, Elizabeth Bathory and Countess Bathory. Quorthon worked part-time at the small record label Tyfon Grammofon, which was owned by his father, Börje Forsberg. In late 1983, the label was putting together a compilation of songs by Scandinavian metal bands. However, at the last minute, one of the bands backed out. Tyfon agreed to let Bathory appear on the record as a replacement. The album, called Scandinavian Metal Attack, was released in March 1984 and was Bathory's first appearance on record. Unexpectedly, the two Bathory tracks "Sacrifice" and "The Return of Darkness and Evil" drew a great deal of fan mail.

Soon afterward, Tyfon asked Quorthon to record a full-length album. His bandmates having moved away, Quorthon recruited Rickard Bergman from his former oi-punk band Stridskuk as bassist and Stefan Larsson from punk band Obsklass as drummer. On 22 May 1984, they had their first and only rehearsal together before recording the album. Two songs were recorded at the 22 May rehearsal: "Witchcraft" and "Satan My Master" making it the first recording of the debut album line-up. The debut album, Bathory, was recorded in June at Heavenshore Studio (a converted garage) in Stockholm and released in October that year. Over the next four years, Bathory released a further three albums: The Return…… (1985), Under the Sign of the Black Mark (1987) and Blood Fire Death (1988).

Bathory's early work was dark, fast, heavily distorted and raw recording (lo-fi). Quorthon's vocals were harsh, high-pitched and raspy with occasional shrieks and screams. The band's lyrics focused on 'dark' topics and included anti-Christian and 'Satanic' references. These traits came to define black metal and the band used this style on their first four albums. Quorthon said that the band were not Satanists but used 'Satanic' references to provoke and attack Christianity. With the third and fourth albums he began "attacking Christianity from a different angle", realizing that Satanism is a "Christian product" and seeing them both as "religious hocus-pocus".

Quorthon described Bathory's early sound as a "mixture" of Black Sabbath, Motörhead and GBH, singling out GBH's City Baby Attacked by Rats and Motörhead's Ace of Spades and Iron Fist, and was also influenced by the Exploited, Sex Pistols, Disorder, Riot/Clone, Anti-Nowhere League, Kiss, and Exciter. The term 'black metal' came from Venom's 1982 album of that name. Many fans and reviewers have claimed Venom was an influence on Bathory, or even accused Bathory of copying Venom. Quorthon often denied being influenced by Venom and claimed that he "heard Venom for the first time in late 1984 or early 1985" and never owned a Venom album. However, he admitted in an interview for Metal Forces that he first listened to Venom's Black Metal in 1983 and considered it "one of the best albums ever made." Bathory's early sound has always been associated with Slayer but Quorthon denied being influenced by them.

Bathory stopped performing live in 1985, with Quorthon viewing organizing concerts as too much hassle.

Although Bathory's fourth album, Blood Fire Death (1988), largely followed in the style of the albums before it, some songs had a very different style. These songs have a much slower tempo, acoustic passages, choral background singing, and lyrics about Vikings and Norse mythology. Music critic Eduardo Rivadavia of AllMusic describes this 'epic' style as "possibly the first true example" of Viking metal.

Viking metal years (1990s–2000s) 
After Blood Fire Death, the band shed its early black metal style. Their fifth album, Hammerheart (1990), was the first " Viking metal album". This was said to have been influenced by the American power metal band Manowar, although Quorthon described this rumour as "another total misconception". A music video was made for the song "One Rode to Asa Bay". The style of Hammerheart was continued on Twilight of the Gods (1991) and Blood on Ice (recorded in 1989 but completed in 1996).

With Requiem (1994) and Octagon (1995), Bathory changed style once more, this time turning to retro-thrash in the vein of 1980s Bay Area thrash bands. However, the 2001 release Destroyer of Worlds was a transitional release that led to a full return to the Viking metal style with the releases of Nordland I (2002) and Nordland II (2003).

Quorthon's death 
In June 2004, Quorthon was found dead in his home, apparently due to heart failure. He was known to suffer from heart problems in the past. On 3 June 2006, Black Mark Production released a box set in tribute to Quorthon, containing three CDs of his favorite Bathory and Quorthon songs, a 176-page booklet, a DVD with his long-form video for "One Rode to Asa Bay", an interview and some rare promo footage and a poster.

Several Bathory tribute albums have been compiled by black metal artists, such as In Conspiracy with Satan – A Tribute to Bathory and Voices from Valhalla – A Tribute to Bathory. In August 2004, several members of the Norwegian black metal scene gathered to perform Bathory songs in a set titled A Tribute to Quorthon at the Hole in the Sky festival in Bergen, Norway. These musicians included Abbath (Immortal), Apollyon (Aura Noir), Faust and Samoth (Emperor and Zyklon), Gaahl (Gorgoroth), Grutle Kjellson and Ivar Bjørnson (Enslaved), Nocturno Culto (Darkthrone) and Satyr (Satyricon).

In popular culture
The Swedish black metal band Watain played a live tribute to Quorthon and the band Bathory at the Sweden Rock Festival 2010. The resulting recording was the limited-edition album Tonight We Raise Our Cups and Toast in Angels Blood: A Tribute to Bathory with 7 tracks, and was released on 23 February 2015. It was also released as 12" album, the latter in 1300 numbered copies with four tracks, "A Fine Day to Die" (10:48), "The Return of Darkness and Evil" (4:36), "Rite of Darkness" (2:19) and "Reaper" (2:46) on Side A and three tracks "Enter the Eternal Fire" (7:14), "Sacrifice" (4:06) and "Born for Burning" (7:11) on Side B.

The release proved very popular with Swedish public, with the limited vinyl edition reaching number 1 on the vinyl chart. The album made it also to number 2 on the national Sverigetopplistan chart, the official Swedish Albums Chart in February 2015.

Band members 
 Quorthon (Thomas Börje Forsberg) –  vocals, guitar, bass guitar, drums, percussion, keyboards, synthesizers lyrics, composer (1983–2004; died 2004)
 The Animal (Björn Kristensen) – vocals (1983)
 Freddan/Hanoi (Frederick Melander) – bass guitar (1983–1984)
 Vans McBurger (Jonas Åkerlund) – drums (1983–1984)
 Ribban – bass guitar (1984)
 Stefan Larsson – drums (1984–1986)
 Adde – bass guitar (1985)
 Christer Sandström – bass guitar  (1986–1987)
 Paul Pålle Lundburg – drums (1986–1987)
 Kothaar – bass guitar (1988–1996)
 Vvornth – drums (1988–1996)

Timeline

Discography

Studio albums 
 Bathory (1984)
 The Return…… (1985)
 Under the Sign of the Black Mark (1987)
 Blood Fire Death (1988)
 Hammerheart (1990)
 Twilight of the Gods (1991)
 Requiem (1994)
 Octagon (1995)
 Blood on Ice (1996) 
 Destroyer of Worlds (2001)
 Nordland I (2002)
 Nordland II (2003)

Compilation albums 
 Jubileum Volume I (1992)
 Jubileum Volume II (1993)
 Jubileum Volume III (1998)
 Katalog (2001)
 In Memory of Quorthon (2006)

Notes

References

Bibliography

External links 
Bathory on Black Mark Production 
[ Bathory] at AllMusic

Swedish black metal musical groups
Swedish thrash metal musical groups
Musical groups established in 1983
Musical groups disestablished in 2004
Musical groups from Stockholm
English-language singers from Sweden
Musical quartets
1983 establishments in Sweden
2004 disestablishments in Sweden
Noise Records artists
Black Mark Production artists